Hernán Santa Cruz (1906 – 1999 in Santiago) was a Chilean delegate to the United Nations, judge, lawyer and one of the initial drafters of the Universal Declaration of Human Rights.

Life and career 
Santa Cruz was born into an upper-middle-class family. His father had been a lawyer, journalist and mayor of a district of Santiago. Santa Cruz began working in the public sector as a lawyer around 1922. Initially a lecturer on criminal and military procedure, he later received an role as a judge on Chile's Superior Military Court. He was appointed as Permanent Representative of Chile to the United Nations in 1946 by President Gabriel González Videla. Though he did not (at the time) believe he had the background or ability to serve effectively, he would come to refer to it as the start of a second existence.

Santa Cruz's role in the United Nations, as a delegate of the Third Committee and Human Rights Commission, was a formative one. The U.S. State Department observed that during his service at the UN, "on one occasion while his family was out of town," he "sold the entire household effects, including his wife's clothing, and gave the proceeds to his mistress."

In 1953, Santa Cruz left the Chilean diplomatic service to work for the UN directly. 1958 saw him join the UN Food and Agriculture Organization (FAO), where he served as Regional Director for Latin America and later a sub-director of the organization. Other bodies he engaged with included the UNCTAD, ILO, UNDP, G77 and the Non-Aligned Movement. Santa Cruz retired in 1984.

He died in 1999 in Santiago and had at least one child, Rodrigo Santa Cruz.

Ideas and legacy 

According to Susan Waltz, although Santa Cruz "held no position of responsibility...his political and substantive contributions were such" that his co-drafter, John Peters Humphrey and the author Johannes Morsink later singled out the important role he played in shaping the Declaration's transition away from "eighteenth century Enlightenment philosophy" towards "socioeconomic rights."

In addition to his work on the declaration, Santa Cruz was "actively involved in the establishment of the United Nations Economic Commission for Latin America and the Caribbean" in 1947. ECLAC's library in Santiago is named after him.

External links 

 1970 address at the FAO by Santa Cruz
 Hernán Santa Cruz at the UN Audiovisual Library

References

1906 births
1999 deaths
20th-century Chilean judges
Chilean diplomats
Permanent Representatives of Chile to the United Nations